is a former Japanese football player. He last played for Tochigi City FC.

Playing career
Matsushita was born in Takasaki on December 7, 1981. After graduating from high school, he joined J1 League club Sanfrecce Hiroshima in 2000. Although he could hardly play in the match until 2001, he played many matches as defensive midfielder in 2002. However Sanfrecce finished at the 15th place in 2002 season and was relegated to J2 League. In 2003, Sanfrecce won the 2nd place and was returned to J1 in a year.

In 2004, Matsushita moved to J2 club Avispa Fukuoka. Although he could not play many matches in 2004, he played many matches and Avispa won the 2nd place in 2005. However he could hardly play in the match in J1 in 2006. In June 2006, he moved to Kawasaki Frontale.

In 2007, Matsushita moved to J2 club Thespa Kusatsu (later Thespakusatsu Gunma) based in his local Gunma Prefecture. He became a regular player as defensive midfielder soon and played many matches in 6 seasons. In 2013, he moved to J2 club Yokohama FC and played many matches in 2 seasons. In 2015, he re-joined Thespakusatsu Gunma for the first time in 2 years. Although he played as regular player, the club results was sluggish and was relegated to J3 League end of 2017 season. His opportunity to play also decreased in 2018.

On 22 December 2018, Tochigi City FC announced the signing of Matsushita from Thespakusatsu Gunma.

Club statistics

References

External links

1981 births
Living people
Association football people from Gunma Prefecture
Japanese footballers
J1 League players
J2 League players
J3 League players
Japan Football League players
Sanfrecce Hiroshima players
Avispa Fukuoka players
Kawasaki Frontale players
Thespakusatsu Gunma players
Yokohama FC players
Tochigi City FC players
Association football midfielders